Kustov (from куст meaning bush) is a Russian masculine surname, its feminine counterpart is Kustova. It may refer to
Darya Kustova (born 1986), Belarusian tennis player
Pavel Kustov (born 1965), Russian ski jumper

Russian-language surnames